Jackson County is located in the Commonwealth of Kentucky. As of the 2021 census estimation, the population was 12,984. Its county seat is McKee. The county was formed in 1858 from land given by Madison, Estill, Owsley, Clay, Laurel, and Rockcastle counties.  It was named for Andrew Jackson, seventh President of the United States. Jackson County became a moist county via a "local-option" referendum in the Fall of 2019 that made the sale of alcoholic beverages in the county seat, McKee, legal.

One fourth of Jackson County is within the Daniel Boone National Forest (56,000 acres), making it representative of eastern Kentucky's unique Appalachian topography, wildlife, and heritage. The county is home to many attractions and recreation spots such as Flat Lick Falls, public national forest campgrounds Turkey Foot and S-Tree, and the centermost trailhead (located in the county seat, McKee) of the historic Sheltowee Trace.

Jackson County is the birthplace of the Grand Ole Opry star David "Stringbean" Akeman, and the site of the annually reenacted Battle of Big Hill, the Civil War skirmish that led to the Battle of Richmond in Madison County.

Outdoor recreation

National recreation areas 
The S-Tree campground sits on a ridge above Horse Lick Creek near McKee in Jackson County. A small picnic area features a historic picnic shelter that was constructed in the 1930s by the Civilian Conservation Corps. The campground receives heavy weekend use from off-highway vehicle users who ride the adjacent Sheltowee Trace National Recreation Trail and the Renfro Loop Trail. These trails may be accessed from the campground.

The Turkey Foot campground is nestled along the banks of War Fork Creek in Jackson County. The creek is stocked with trout throughout the year. All of the campsites are wooded. A playfield with a horseshoe pit is located at the end of camping sites alongside the creek. Trails include the Turkey Foot Loop Trail and the Sheltowee Trace National Recreation Trail.

Flat Lick Falls is tucked into the hills of southern Jackson County and consists of recreational facilities which include primitive camping, picnic shelters, and restrooms. The park features 86.09 acres of wooded land, cliffs and Flat Lick Creek running through the middle of the park with a 28-foot water fall emptying into a large pool at the bottom of the falls. The creek flows into the Laurel Fork Creek. The falls can be viewed up close via the meandering paths along the cliff line including a paved path leading to a wheelchair accessible viewing platform.
Sheltowee Trace National Recreation Trail is over 300 miles of National Recreation Trail, established in 1979, in the Appalachian region of the Eastern U.S., and reaches from northern Rowan County, Kentucky to the Leather Wood Trail Head in the Big South Fork National River and Recreation Area just across the Tennessee border. The Trail runs mostly through the Daniel Boone National Forest, and is named for the Shawnee word for “Big Turtle”, which was the name given to Daniel Boone in 1779 when he was adopted as the son of the great warrior chief Blackfish. Jackson County encompasses approximately 35 miles of the Sheltowee Trace, which is open to hiking, horseback riding, and mountain bikes.  Some sections also allow all-terrain vehicles.

Public parks 
 Bond Memorial Park 
 Jack Gabbard Park 
 McKee City Park
 Gray Hawk Community Park
 Sand Gap Community Park
 Worthington Park 
 Jackson Energy Farm/Recreational Fields

Lakes and reservoirs 
 Beulah Lake
 Owsley Fork Reservoir 
 McKee Reservoir

National protected areas 
 Daniel Boone National Forest (part)
 Mill Creek Wildlife Management Area

Geography 
Jackson County is located on the edge of the Cumberland Plateau and Eastern Kentucky Coalfields region of Kentucky, adjacent to the Kentucky Bluegrass region. Because of this, the county's motto is "where the mountains and the bluegrass blend." The elevation of the county ranges from 600 ft. to 1600 ft. above sea level. The Middle Fork of the Rockcastle River originates in southern Jackson County. Karst landscapes can also be found in the northern part of the county, creating notable caves such as Wind Cave near Turkey Foot campground.

Major routes 
 US Route 421
 KY Route 30
 KY Route 290
 KY Route 3630 (Old KY Route 30)

US Route 421 serves as the county's north–south corridor, connecting it to Madison County, the cities of Richmond and Berea , and I-75 to the north. While it connects the county to Clay County, the city of Manchester, and the Hal Rogers Parkway to the south. This route also connects the communities of Sandgap, McKee and Tyner within the county.

KY Route 30 is a newly constructed highway that serves as the main east–west corridor, passing through the southern part of the county, through the communities of Annville and Tyner. It is referred to as the Interstate 75 - Mountain Parkway connector. It connects the county to both of these major freeways as well as to the cities of London (Laurel County), Booneville (Owsley County), and Beattyville (Lee County). 

KY Route 290 connects US Route 421 in McKee to KY Route 3630 in Annville.

Adjacent counties 
 Estill County (north)
 Lee County (northeast)
 Owsley County (east)
 Clay County (southeast)
 Laurel County (southwest)
 Rockcastle County (west)
 Madison County (northwest)

Events

Jackson County Fair & Homecoming 
This event is held annually on the Friday and Saturday before Labor Day. Activities include a show, craft exhibits, musical entertainment, clogging, vendors, food trucks, and a parade.

Sheltowee Trace Artisans Fair 
Local and guest artisans from across the state and beyond come to teach, demonstrate, and sell their crafts at this event, which is held during the first weekend in May.

Battle of Big Hill Reenactment 
The reenactment takes place the third weekend of August at the Jackson Energy Farm on HWY 290, about 6 miles south of McKee. A family-friendly outdoor event, reenactments generally take place over two days, and consist of games, historical speakers, a ladies and gentlemen's tea, food,  and music before the actual battle. After dark, couples can follow the cues of the square dancing caller at the Civil War Ball, featuring local musicians playing songs from the era.

Stringbean Music Festival 
Most people remember David "Stringbean" Akemon from the old television show "Hee-Haw" but folks in Jackson County knew him as brother, uncle, and friend. Although a famous performer, "Stringbean" returned often to his home in Jackson County. In June 1996, Porter Wagoner, Grandpa & Ramona Jones, Mac Wiseman and a host of other entertainers and friends gathered to unveil a larger than life statue of Stringbean, and established a memorial in his honor. Since then, the festive has grown tremendously. Today, two festivals are held - one in June and one in October - and both feature nationally known bluegrass music performers, as well as mountain arts and crafts.

Economy 
The Jackson County Industrial Development Authority (JCIDA) assists with economic development efforts in the county. The authority manages 3 industrial parks in the county which include the Jackson County Regional Industrial Park in Annville, the McKee Industrial Park in McKee, and the Northern Jackson County Industrial Park in Sandgap.

Major employers in Jackson County include:

 Jackson County Public Schools
 People's Rural Telephone Cooperative (PRTC)
 Jackson Energy Cooperative
 Bear Precision Coatings
 DTS Industries
 JC Tech Industries
 The Allen Company (Clover Bottom Limestone Quarry)
 Phillips Diversified Manufacturing
 Senture
 Teleworks USA

Utilities 
Jackson County is served by Jackson Energy, which is based in the City of McKee, and serves Jackson County and surrounding counties such as Lee County, Owsley County, Clay County, Laurel County, Rockcastle County, and Madison County. Jackson County, Owsley County, and Clay County are served by Peoples Rural Telephone Cooperative, also based in the City of McKee. Water is provided by the Jackson County Water Association and garbage pickup is provided by Woods Sanitation. Residents within the City of McKee are served by McKee Water and Sewer.

Healthcare 
Jackson County does not have a hospital. Nearby facilities include Saint Joseph Hospital (Berea), Baptist Health Hospital (Richmond), Advent Health (Manchester), Saint Joseph Hospital (London) and, Rockcastle Regional Hospital. (Mt. Vernon)

Emergency medical services for Jackson County are provided by the Jackson County Ambulance Service. Jackson County does have a few primary care facilities which include the White House Clinic, McKee Medical Clinic, Advent Health Clinic, and Annville Medical Clinic.

Demographics

As of the 2020 census there were 12,955 people and 5,417 households in the county. There were 5,978 housing units. The racial makeup of the county was 97.5% White, 0.4% Black or African American, 0.3% Native American, 0.2% Asian, 0% Pacific Islander, 0.8% from two or more races, and 0.9% Hispanic or Latino of any race.

23.3% of the population are under the age of 18 and 18% of the population are 65 years of age or older. There are 529 veterans residing within the county.

The median income for a household in the county was $31,515. The per capita income for the county was $17,573. About 24% of the population are below the poverty line.

The median value for housing units is $83,100 and the average rent is $526 a month.

72.1% of the population has a high school education or higher. 10.2% of the population has a bachelor's degree or higher. 78.8% of households have a computer and 70.7% have a broadband internet subscription.

Communities

Cities 
 McKee (county seat)

Census-designated place 
 Annville (largest community)

Unincorporated places 
 Gray Hawk
 Sand Gap
 Tyner

Politics

National politics 
In presidential elections, Jackson County has voted Republican since the Civil War and has never voted Democratic. Lyndon Johnson in 1964 and Bill Clinton in 1996 are the only Democratic candidates to ever win as much as 20% of the county's vote. The only time Jackson County has not voted for the Republican Party was in its first election of 1860 when the county went to Constitutional Unionist John Bell, and in 1912 when the Republican Party was split and third party candidate Theodore Roosevelt carried the county with 52 percent of the vote over William Howard Taft with 34 percent.

Jackson County has a strong history of giving Republican candidates some of their highest winning percentages in the nation. This was the case in the 1928, 1948, 1960, 1976, 1988, and 1992 presidential elections. In 1992 Jackson County, along with Sioux County, Iowa, were the only two counties in the U.S to vote for Republican George H. W. Bush by over 70 percent in his re-election campaign. Additionally, Republican Alf Landon, who lost 46 of 48 states, received over 89 percent of Jackson County's vote in 1936.

Local and state politics 
Jackson County is part of Kentucky's 5th Congressional District, which is represented by Republican Hal Rogers. In the Kentucky House of Representatives, the county is in the 89th District and is represented by Republican Timmy Truett. In the Kentucky Senate, the county is in the 21st District and is represented by Republican Brandon Storm.

Prohibition
The entirety of Jackson County prohibited the sale of alcoholic beverages from the years 1937 until 2019 when the City of McKee held a vote during the 2019 General Election regarding the ability for the city to grant licenses to businesses for selling alcoholic beverages. The vote's results were 100 in favor of selling alcohol to 81 who were not.

Education

Public education 
The county is served by Jackson County Public Schools which operates the following schools:
 McKee Elementary School
 Sand Gap Elementary School
 Tyner Elementary School 
 Jackson County Middle School
 Jackson County High School
 Jackson County Area Technology Center

Private education 

 Annville Christian Academy (K-12)

Higher education 
There are no higher education institutes within the county, but some nearby universities and colleges include:

 Berea College (Berea Campus)
 Eastern Kentucky University (Richmond and Manchester Campus)
 Somerset Community College (London Campus)

Public library 
Jackson County has a lending library, the Jackson County Public Library, located in downtown McKee.

Notable people

 David "Stringbean" Akeman (1915-1973), country music star
 Andrew N. Johnson (1876-1959), Prohibition Party nominee for vice president of the United States in 1944
 Freddie Langdon (1922-1988), world champion fiddler

See also

 Eastern Kentucky Coalfields Region
 National Register of Historic Places listings in Jackson County, Kentucky

References

External links
 Official Government Website of Jackson County, Kentucky
 Official Tourism Website of Jackson County, Kentucky
 Official Website of Jackson County Public Schools
 Official Website of Annville Christian Academy

 
Kentucky counties
Counties of Appalachia
1858 establishments in Kentucky
Populated places established in 1858